The 1986–87 División de Honor Femenina de Balonmano was the 30th edition of the premier Spanish women's handball championship, running from 15 September 1986 to 29 March 1987. The competition returned to a regular system, instead of the previous season's three stages format.

Íber Valencia won its tenth title in a row, winning all 22 games. CB Onda and CB Leganés followed in European positions, qualifying for the Cup Winners' Cup and IHF Cup respectively.

Standings

References

Division de Honor
Division de Honor
División de Honor Femenina de Balonmano seasons
Division de Honor
Division de Honor
1986 in women's handball
1987 in women's handball